Alfyorov or Alferov is a Russian masculine surname derived from the given name Yelevfery; its feminine counterpart is Alfyorova or Alferova. The surname may refer to:

 Aleksandr Alfyorov (born 1962), Russian football player and coach
 Irina Alfyorova (born 1951), Russian actress
 Ksenia Alfyorova (born 1974), Russian theatre and film actress, TV presenter
 Viktor Alfyorov (born 1977), Russian theatrical director and actor
Yevgeni Alfyorov (born 1995), Russian football player
 Zhores Alferov (1930–2019), Russian physicist
 3884 Alferov (1977 EM1), asteroid named after Zhores

References

Russian-language surnames